Ubirodynerus is a monotypic Australian genus of potter wasps. The sole species, Ubirodynerus excavatus, is regarded as a synonym of Delta excavata.

References

 Ubirodynerus. Atlas of Living Australia. http://bie.ala.org.au/species/urn:lsid:biodiversity.org.au:afd.taxon:e3b4f3f8-1fe9-4749-909a-41cd2f304722#

Biological pest control wasps
Monotypic Hymenoptera genera
Potter wasps